Anton Jamnik may refer to:
 Anton Jamnik (bishop) (born 1961),  Slovenian Roman Catholic prelate and philosopher
  (1862–1942), Slovenian inventor